"I Can't Ask for Anymore Than You" is a song by British singer Cliff Richard, released as the third single from his album I'm Nearly Famous in July 1976. It reached number 17 in the UK Singles Chart and number 80 in the Billboard Hot 100. It also did particularly well in Ireland, reaching number 2.

Release
"I Can't Ask for Anymore Than You" was written by Ken Gold and Michael Denne. Produced by Bruce Welch, it features Richard signing in falsetto, something he hadn't done before. Tony Rivers has said that "the original demo featured Mick singing the lead vocals in his high voice and Bruce liked it so much he kept it in the same key, and got Cliff to sing it in that key!". It was released as a single with the B-side "Junior Cowboy", written by Michael Allison and Peter Sills.

Track listing
7": EMI / EMI 2499
 "I Can't Ask for Anymore Than You" – 2:50
 "Junior Cowboy" – 2:44

Personnel
Cliff Richard – vocals  
Terry Britten – guitar
Alan Tarney – bass
Clem Cattini – drums
Graham Todd – keyboards
Tony Rivers – backing vocals, vocal arrangement
John Perry – backing vocals
Ken Gold – backing vocals
Richard Hewson – string arrangements
Bruce Welch – producer, arrangement

Chart performance

References

1976 songs
1976 singles
Cliff Richard songs
EMI Records singles
The Rocket Record Company singles
MCA Records singles